Esade Law School is the law school of Ramon Llull University. It is run by ESADE. It was created in 1992 in order to train legal professionals capable of coping with the challenges posed by globalisation. The law school is situated on the Esade campus in Barcelona and has offshoots in Madrid, Buenos Aires and Casablanca.

Along with some of the best European universities, the Esade Law School created the European Joint Degree in Business Law (THEMIS Programme) and is the only faculty in Spain to offer students the opportunity to obtain this degree, furthermore, it is the only Law School in Spain to have a Professional Council made up of representatives from all legal professions and over 30 internationally renowned Law firms.

The law school has a high standing among law firms and scholars in Spain and its programs have been ranked 1st in Spain by the Spanish media in 2004, 2005 and 2006.

See also
 List of Jesuit sites

References

ESADE
Law schools in Spain
1992 establishments in Spain